Springfield Baptist Church may refer to:

 Springfield Baptist Church (Augusta, Georgia), listed on the NRHP in Georgia
 Springfield Baptist Church (Greensboro, Georgia), listed on the NRHP in Georgia
 Springfield Baptist Church (Springfield, Kentucky), listed on the NRHP in Kentucky